Faveria sordida is a species of moth in the family Pyralidae. It was described by Staudinger in 1879. It is found on Cyprus, and in Israel, Asia Minor and Iraq.

References

Moths described in 1879
Phycitini
Moths of Europe
Moths of Asia